The LEB Plata is the third basketball division of the Spanish basketball league system and the second basketball division organized by the Spanish Basketball Federation. Since 2019, three teams are promoted to LEB Oro and six teams are relegated to Liga EBA.

LEB Plata history

League names 
 2000–2006: LEB 2
 2006–2007: Adecco LEB 2
 2007–2015: Adecco Plata
 2015–present: LEB Plata

Champions

Performance by club

Current clubs

Copa LEB Plata
The Copa LEB Plata (LEB Plata Cup) is a championship played since 2001.

In the first editions, the three top teams in the first half season and an organizer team played the Cup in a Final Four format.  Since 2009, the teams who play this cup are two first qualified in the half season, and it's hosted by the first qualified . The winner of the Copa LEB Plata will be the first team in the play-offs if it finishes between the second and the fifth at the final of the Regular Season.

Final Four Editions

2001

2002

2003

2004

2005

2006

2007

2008

Since 2009, the Copa LEB Plata is only played with the two top teams at the first half of the LEB Plata season

Stat leaders at LEB Plata

Notes

External links 
 Official website

  
3
2
SPainGre
 Professional sports leagues in Spain